Sigma AB (or Sigma Group) is a group of companies carrying out consultancy operations within IT, information logistics, engineering services, technical R&D, industry and social structure. 

The company was founded in 1986 by Dan Olofsson, who is now chairman of the board. The Sigma Group has 5000 employees in 16 countries.

Sigma AB was previously listed on the Stockholm Stock Exchange Small Cap list and NASDAQ OMX. On 8 May 2013, Sigma requested that the company be delisted from NASDAQ OMX on 21 May that same year, after Danir AB acquired over 95% of the shares in the company. At the same time, Danir requested that the remaining shares be compulsorily redeemed. Since then, the company has been a wholly-owned subsidiary of Danir AB, which the Olofsson family owns. 

Sigma AB offers its services through the business areas Sigma Technology, Sigma Connectivity, Sigma Industry, Sigma Civil and Sigma Software, within which Sigma AB provides group management and manages the overall Sigma brand.

Business Areas 

 Sigma Technology
 Sigma Connectivity
 Sigma Industry
 Sigma Industry East North
 Sigma Industry West
 Sigma Industry South
 Sigma Civil
 Sigma Software

References

External links

Sigma AB Official website

Information technology companies of Sweden
Swedish companies established in 1986
Companies based in Malmö
20th-century establishments in Skåne County